Sepulenia is an extinct genus of stem sawflies in the family Sepulcidae. There is one described species in Sepulenia, S. syricta.

The genus was identified by Alexandr Pavlovich Rasnitsyn. It was named after fictional things called sepulki, found in Stanisław Lem's The Star Diaries and Observation on the Spot The name of the species is literally translated as "sepuling with whistle".<ref> Каракоз Роман. Где живут сепульки: [О двух видах палеонтологических перепончатокрылых — Sepulka mirabilis и Sepulenia syricta] // Новая интересная газета (Киев). — 2004. — № 1. — С. 5. — (Блок Z: Просто фантастика). Аннотация
Quote: Оказывается, сепулек, которые оказались вовсе не моллюсками, а перепончатокрылыми насекомыми, открыл Александр Павлович Расницын (кстати, работающий в одной лаборатории с известным писателем Кириллом Еськовым). Он-то и посылал в свое время Лему свою книжку, где, кроме прочего, были описаны Сепулька удивительная (Sepulca mirabilis) и Сепуление со свистом (дословно – свистящее: Sepulenia syricta).</ref> The relation to Lem's sepulki is understandable in both Polish and Russian, but their English translation obscures their association with ancient insects as they are translated as Scrupts'' in English editions of Lem's novels.

References

Sawflies
Commemoration of Stanisław Lem